LGBT-related films released in the 2000s are listed in the following articles:
 List of LGBT-related films of 2000
 List of LGBT-related films of 2001
 List of LGBT-related films of 2002
 List of LGBT-related films of 2003
 List of LGBT-related films of 2004
 List of LGBT-related films of 2005
 List of LGBT-related films of 2006
 List of LGBT-related films of 2007
 List of LGBT-related films of 2008
 List of LGBT-related films of 2009

 
2000s